Kristin Berg (born 19 December 1968) is a Canadian former biathlete who competed in the 1994 Winter Olympics and in the 1998 Winter Olympics.

References

1968 births
Living people
Canadian female biathletes
Olympic biathletes of Canada
Biathletes at the 1994 Winter Olympics
Biathletes at the 1998 Winter Olympics
20th-century Canadian women